Two Bridges is a settlement in east Cornwall, England, United Kingdom,  west-southwest of Launceston at the point where the A30 trunk road crosses the River Inny.

References

Hamlets in Cornwall